Kulcsár or Kulcsar is a Hungarian surname that may refer to
Anita Kulcsár (1976–2005), Hungarian handball player
Kulcsár Anita-emléktorna, Anita Kulcsár memorial handball tournament
Dávid Kulcsár (born 1988), Hungarian football player 
Edina Kulcsár (born 1990), Hungarian actress, fashion model and beauty queen
Janka Kulcsár (born 1985), Hungarian pianist 
János Kulcsár (1927–1989), Hungarian sprint canoer
József Kulcsár (born 1954), Hungarian politician
Gábor Kulcsar, Hungarian sprint canoer
Gergely Kulcsár (1934–2020), Hungarian javelin thrower
George Kulcsar (György Kulcsár, born 1967), Hungarian-Australian football player
Győző Kulcsár (born 1940), Hungarian fencer
Kálmán Kulcsár (1928–2010), Hungarian politician and jurist
Katalin Kulcsár (born 1984), Hungarian football referee
Kornél Kulcsár (born 1991), Hungarian football player
Krisztián Kulcsár (born 1971), Hungarian fencer, nephew of Győző
Tamás Kulcsár (born 1982), Hungarian football player